Patrick Heron (2 February 1952 – 2 January 2014) was an Irish author, born and raised in Dublin, Ireland. He became interested in Bible prophecy concerning the "end times" around 1996.

His first book, Apocalypse Soon was published in 1997 and became a bestseller in Ireland. In the About the Author section at the back of the book Heron stated that he believed God had personally told him that he would be alive at the moment of Jesus' Second Coming. Heron believed his book, The Nephilim and the Pyramid of the Apocalypse, is the first ever book proving who built the pyramids and why.

Education
Heron held a B.Sc. and M.A. in Business Studies from Trinity College, Dublin. He also held a Degree in Theology and received an Honorary Doctorate in Christian Literature from the California Pacific School of Theology, Glendale, California, as a result of the research done in his book, The Nephilim and the Pyramid of the Apocalypse.

Books
Apocalypse Soon 
The Nephilim and the Pyramid of the Apocalypse
The Apocalypse Generation
The Return of the Nephilim
Return of the Anti-Christ And The New World Order

Death 
Heron died from cancer on 2 January 2014.

References

External links

 Patrick Heron
 The Omega Hour

1952 births
2014 deaths
Irish Christians
Writers from Dublin (city)
Christian writers
Irish religious writers
Alumni of Trinity College Dublin